The Church of St Mary and All Saints is an Anglican church in the village of Whalley, Lancashire, England. It is an active parish church in the Diocese of Blackburn. A church probably existed on the site in Anglo-Saxon times and the current building dates from the 13th century.  It is recorded in the National Heritage List for England as a designated Grade I listed building.

History
A church probably existed on this site in Anglo-Saxon times; there are three well-preserved Anglo-Saxon crosses in the churchyard, as well as fragments from that time in the exterior walls of the current building. The crosses are protected as Scheduled Monuments. The "Church of St Mary held in Wallei" was mentioned in the Domesday Book of 1086. Its endowment of “two carucates of land free of all custom” has been interpreted as the church being one of the wealthiest in what would become Lancashire.

Most of the present church was built in the 13th century, replacing a simpler structure which probably consisted of an aisleless nave and chancel. The tower was added in the late 15th century. A porch was added to the south of the building in 1844, and one to the north in 1909. Restorations took place in 1866 and 1868.

Architecture

Exterior
The church is constructed of sandstone rubble and has stone slate roofs. Its plan consists of a clerestoried nave with aisles to the north and south, a porch to the south, a chancel with a vestry to the north, and a west tower. The large east window is in the perpendicular style and has five cinquefoil lights. The four clerestory windows on either side each have two cinquefoil lights square heads. The north and south aisles both have square-headed windows, five on the south side and three on the north. There are two modern dormer windows in the roof of the north aisle.

The tower is in the perpendicular style and, according to Hartwell and Pevsner, is similar to many North Lancashire church towers. The belfry louvres each have two trefoiled lights with tracery. There is a clock on the east wall of the tower.

Interior and fittings
The south porch was added in 1844, but the doorway into the church contains parts of the pillars from the Norman church of the 11th century. The octagonal font of yellow gritstone dates from the 15th century while the oak cover 17th century.

It is in the Early English style. The north arcade has round piers and the south arcade has octagonal piers; all have moulded caps and bases. The arcade arches are pointed and double-chamfered.

Of particular interest inside the church is the furniture. Indeed, Jenkins, in his England's Thousand Best Churches, suggests that ".. the church could qualify as a museum of ecclesiastical seating". On the north aisle is a churchwarden's pew, which seats eight, dating from 1690, then a constables' pew, benches dated 1638, a rectory pew of 1702 and then, most spectacular of all, St. Anton's Cage (see below).

At the east end of the north aisle there is a chantry chapel dedicated to St Nicholas which is also known as the Soldiers Chapel. It contains evidence of a stair to a rood loft, probable remains of a piscina and an altar stone dating from the Middle Ages and mounted on the wall. The chapel is surrounded by a screen from the 15th century. A chantry chapel at the east end of the south aisle is dedicated to St Mary. It too is surrounded by a 15th-century screen and contains a piscina probably from the 14th century, with an ogee-shaped head. The chapel contains square, wooden pews. The north aisle's north door is oak with glass bullseyes and is enclosed by a wooden porch.

The stalls were carved in about 1430 and came from the church at Whalley Abbey. Rare amongst medieval works, the name of the craftsman, a Mr Eatough, has survived.

The misericord carvings represent subjects including angels, devils, grape vines, griffins, pomegranates, the Holy Trinity, two eagles carrying Alexander to Heaven, a blacksmith shoeing a goose, a girl with a weeping satyr, a wife beating her husband with a pan and a splendid St George and the dragon. Jenkins comments: "The misericords are beautifully executed and deserve nationwide repute."

St. Anton's Cage, a large pew next to the Lady Chapel, was originally for the Nowell family of Read, near Padiham. Made in 1534 it was added to in 1610 and again in 1697. Above its two doors are the initials of the Fort and Taylor families who for years contested ownership of the pew. The date of 1830 refers to the time when the pew was divided, by Ecclesiastical court order, to resolve the dispute. But neither party could bear such a sharing arrangement. The pew was never used again and both families built themselves private galleries elsewhere in the nave. These have now disappeared. An oak box within the pew contains a 1684 edition of Foxe's Book of Martyrs and an early edition of Whittaker's History of Whalley.

The organ, dating from 1727, was originally built for Lancaster Priory. It was purchased in 1813 at a cost of three hundred guineas (equivalent to £ as of ).

Churchyard
The churchyard has three stone Anglo-Saxon crosses, probably dating from the 10th or 11th century. There is a sundial east of the church which is listed at Grade II. It dates from 1757.

Governance
In September 2015 Revd Jonathan Carmyllie was appointed the Vicar of West Pendleside parishes. Currently serving in the Diocese of Manchester, Revd Carmyllie was Instituted and Inducted at St Nicholas' church, Sabden on 30 September 2015.

See also

Grade I listed churches in Lancashire 
Grade I listed buildings in Lancashire
Scheduled monuments in Lancashire
Listed buildings in Whalley, Lancashire

References

Footnotes

Sources

External links

St Mary and All Saints at Ribble Valley Borough Council

Church of England church buildings in Lancashire
Diocese of Blackburn
Grade I listed churches in Lancashire
Mary and All Saints, Whalley
Scheduled monuments in Lancashire